The Leuctridae are a family of stoneflies. They are known commonly as rolled-winged stoneflies and needleflies. This family contains at least 390 species.

Description
The wings are slender and cylindrical, usually dark brown in color. At rest, the wings appear to be wrapping their bodies. The adults develop in early spring, swarm, mate, and lay the eggs in the water. The slender, yellowish larvae are herbivorous, feeding on plants and organic waste.

Distribution
The species of Leuctridae have a mainly Holarctic distribution.

Systematics

Subfamilies, tribes, and genera include:
 Subfamily Leuctrinae Klapálek 1905
 Tribe Leuctrini Klapálek 1905
 Genus Calileuctra Shepard & Baumann, 1995
 Genus Despaxia Ricker, 1943
 Genus Leuctra Stephens, 1836
 Genus Moselia Ricker, 1943
 Genus Pachyleuctra Despax, 1929
 Genus Paraleuctra Hanson, 1941
 Genus Perlomyia Banks, 1906
 Genus Pomoleuctra Stark & Kyzar, 2001
 Genus Rhopalopsole Klapálek, 1912
 Genus Zealeuctra Ricker, 1952
 Tribe Tyrrhenoleuctrini
 Genus Tyrrhenoleuctra Consiglio, 1957
 Subfamily Megaleuctrinae Zwick 1973
 Genus Megaleuctra Neave, 1934
 Extinct genera
 Genus †Baltileuctra Chen, 2018 Baltic amber, Eocene
 Genus †Euroleuctra Chen, 2018 Baltic amber, Eocene
 Genus †Lycoleuctra Sinitshenkova, 1987 Glushkovo Formation, Russia, Late Jurassic (Tithonian)
 Genus †Rasnitsyrina Sinitshenkova, 2011 Ulaan-Ereg Formation, Mongolia, Late Jurassic (Tithonian) Khasurty, Russia, Early Cretaceous (Aptian)
 Genus †Palaeopsole Caruso and Wichard 2011 Baltic amber, Eocene

References

External links
 Biolib
 Tree of Life

Plecoptera families